Below is the list of populated places in Mersin Province, Turkey by the ilçes (districts). The first four districts (Akdeniz, Mezitli, Toroslar, and Yenişehir) are parts of the city of Greater Mersin. In the following lists, the first place in each district list is the administrative center of that district.

Akdeniz 
Akdeniz
Camili, Akdeniz
Esenli, Akdeniz
Hebilli, Akdeniz
Iğdır, Akdeniz
Parmakkurdu, Akdeniz
Puğkaracadağ, Akdeniz
Yanpar, Akdeniz
Yeşilova, Akdeniz

Mezitli 
Mezitli
Akarca, Mezitli
Bozön, Mezitli
Cemilli, Mezitli
Çevlik, Mezitli
Demirışık, Mezitli
Doğançay, Mezitli
Doğlu, Mezitli
Fındıkpınarı, Mezitli
Kocayer, Mezitli
Kuzucu, Mezitli
Kuzucubelen, Mezitli
Pelitkoyağı, Mezitli
Sarılar, Mezitli
Takanlı, Mezitli
Tepeköy, Mersin
Tol, Mezitli
Zeybekler, Mezitli

Toroslar 
Toroslar
Aladağ, Toroslar
Alanyalı, Toroslar
Arslanköy, Toroslar
Atlılar, Toroslar
Ayvagediği, Toroslar
Bekiralanı, Toroslar
Çağlarca, Toroslar
Çamlıdere, Toroslar
Çandır, Toroslar
Çelebili, Toroslar
Çopurlu, Toroslar
Dalakdere, Toroslar
Darısekisi, Toroslar
Değirmendere, Toroslar
Değnek, Toroslar
Doruklu, Toroslar
Evrenli, Toroslar
Gözne, Toroslar
Güzelyayla, Toroslar
Hamzabeyli, Toroslar
Horozlu, Toroslar
Işıktepe, Toroslar
Kavaklıpınar, Toroslar
Kayrakkeşli, Toroslar
Kepirli, Toroslar
Kerimler, Toroslar
Kızılkaya, Toroslar
Korucular, Toroslar
Kurudere, Toroslar
Musalı, Toroslar
Resulköy, Toroslar
Soğucak, Toroslar
Şahinpınarı, Toroslar
Tırtar, Toroslar
Yavca, Toroslar
Yeniköy, Toroslar
Yüksekoluk, Toroslar

Yenişehir 
Yenişehir
Çavak, Yenişehir
Çukurkeşli, Yenişehir
Değirmençay, Yenişehir
Emirler, Yenişehir
İnsu, Yenişehir
Karahacılı, Yenişehir
Kocahamzalı, Yenişehir
Turunçlu, Yenişehir
Uzunkaş, Yenişehir

Anamur 
Anamur
Akine, Anamur
Alataş, Anamur
Anıtlı, Anamur (aka Kaledran)	
Aşağıkükür, Anamur
Boğuntu, Anamur
Bozdoğan, Anamur
Çaltıbükü, Anamur
Çamlıpınar, Anamur
Çamlıpınaralanı, Anamur
Çarıklar, Anamur
Çataloluk, Anamur
Çeltikçi, Anamur
Çukurabanoz, Anamur
Demirören, Anamur
Emirşah, Anamur
Evciler, Anamur
Gercebahşiş, Anamur
Güleç, Anamur
Güneybahşiş, Anamur
Güngören, Anamur
Karaağa, Anamur
Karaçukur, Anamur
Karadere, Anamur
Karalarbahşiş, Anamur
Kaşdişlen, Anamur
Kılıç, Anamur
Kızılaliler, Anamur
Korucuk, Anamur
Köprübaşı, Anamur
Kükür, Anamur
Lale, Anamur
Malaklar, Anamur
Ormancık, Anamur
Ovabaşı, Anamur
Ören, Anamur
Sarıağaç, Anamur
Sarıdana, Anamur
Sugözü, Anamur
Uçarı, Anamur

Aydıncık
Aydıncık
Duruhan, Aydıncık
Eskiyürük, Aydıncık
Hacıbahattin, Aydıncık
Karadere, Aydıncık
Karaseki, Aydıncık
Pembecik, Aydıncık
Teknecik, Aydıncık
Yenikaş, Aydıncık
Yeniyürük, Aydıncık
Yeniyürükkaş, Aydıncık

Bozyazı
Bozyazı
Akcami, Bozyazı
Ardıçlıtaş, Bozyazı
Bahçekoyağı, Bozyazı
Derebaşı, Bozyazı
Dereköy, Bozyazı
Elmakuzu, Bozyazı
Gözce, Bozyazı
Gözsüzce, Bozyazı
Karaisalı, Bozyazı
Kızılca, Bozyazı
Kömürlü, Bozyazı
Lenger, Bozyazı
Narince, Bozyazı
Tekedüzü, Bozyazı
Tekeli, Bozyazı
Tekmen, Bozyazı

Çamlıyayla 
Çamlıyayla
Bağçatağı, Çamlıyayla
Belçınar, Çamlıyayla
Darıpınarı, Çamlıyayla
Fakılar, Çamlıyayla
Giden, Çamlıyayla
Kesecik, Çamlıyayla
Körmenlik, Çamlıyayla
Korucak, Çamlıyayla
Sarıkavak, Çamlıyayla
Sarıkoyak, Çamlıyayla
Sebil, Çamlıyayla

Erdemli 
Erdemli
Akpınar, Erdemli
Alibeyli, Erdemli
Arpaçbahşiş, Erdemli
Arslanlı, Erdemli
Ayaş, Erdemli
Aydınlar, Erdemli
Batısandal, Erdemli
Çamlı, Erdemli
Çerçili, Erdemli
Çeşmeli, Erdemli
Çiftepınar, Erdemli
Çiriş, Erdemli
Dağlı, Erdemli
Doğusandal, Erdemli
Elbeyli, Erdemli
Elvanlı, Erdemli
Esenpınar, Erdemli
Evdilek, Erdemli
Fakılı, Erdemli
Gücüş, Erdemli
Güneyli, Erdemli
Güzeloluk, Erdemli
Hacıalanı, Erdemli
Hacıhalilarpaç, Erdemli
Harfilli, Erdemli
Hüsametli, Erdemli
İlemin, Erdemli
Karaahmetli, Erdemli
Karahıdırlı, Erdemli
Karakeşli, Erdemli
Karayakup, Erdemli
Kargıpınarı, Erdemli
Kayacı, Erdemli
Kızılen, Erdemli
Kızkalesi, Erdemli
Kocahasanlı, Erdemli
Koramşalı, Erdemli
Kösbucağı, Erdemli
Kösereli, Erdemli
Kumkuyu, Erdemli
Kuşluca, Erdemli
Küstülü, Erdemli
Limonlu, Erdemli
Pınarbaşı, Erdemli
Sarıkaya, Erdemli
Sarıyer, Erdemli
Sıraç, Erdemli
Sinap, Erdemli
Sorgun, Erdemli
Şahna, Erdemli
Tapureli, Erdemli
Toros, Erdemli
Tozlu, Erdemli
Tömük, Erdemli
Üçtepe, Erdemli
Üzümlü, Erdemli
Veyselli, Erdemli
Yağda, Erdemli
Yeniyurt, Erdemli

Gülnar
Gülnar
Akova, Gülnar
Ardınçpınarı, Gülnar
Arıkuyusu, Gülnar
Bereket, Gülnar
Beydili, Gülnar
Bolyaran, Gülnar
Bozağaç, Gülnar
Büyükeceli, Gülnar
Çavuşlar, Gülnar
Çukurasma, Gülnar
Çukurkonak, Gülnar
Dayıcık, Gülnar
Dedeler, Gülnar
Delikkaya, Gülnar
Demirözü, Gülnar
Emirhacı, Gülnar
Gezende, Gülnar
Göktürk, Gülnar
Halifeler, Gülnar
Ilısu, Gülnar
İshaklar, Gülnar
Kavakoluğu, Gülnar
Kayrak, Gülnar
Koçaşlı, Gülnar
Konur, Gülnar
Korucuk, Gülnar
Köseçobanlı
Kurbağ, Gülnar
Kuskan, Gülnar
Mollaömerli, Gülnar
Örenpınar, Gülnar
Örtülü, Gülnar
Sipahili, Gülnar
Şeyhömer, Gülnar
Taşoluk, Gülnar
Tepe, Gülnar
Tırnak, Gülnar
Tozkovan, Gülnar
Ulupınar, Gülnar
Üçoluk, Gülnar
Yanışlı, Gülnar
Yarmasu, Gülnar
Yassıbağ, Gülnar
Yenice, Gülnar
Zeyne, Gülnar

Mut 
Mut
Alaçam, Mut
Aşağıköselerli, Mut
Aydınoğlu, Mut
Bağcağız, Mut
Ballı, Mut
Barabanlı, Mut
Bozdoğan, Mut
Burunköy, Mut
Çağlayangedik, Mut
Çaltılı, Mut
Çamlıca, Mut
Çampınar, Mut
Çatakbağ, Mut
Çatalharman, Mut
Çınarlı, Mut
Çivi, Mut
Çortak, Mut
Çömelek, Mut
Çukurbağ, Mut
Dağpazarı, Mut
Demirkapı, Mut
Dereköy, Mut
Derinçay, Mut
Diştaş, Mut
Elbeyli, Mut
Elmapınar, Mut
Esençay, Mut
Evren, Mut
Fakırca, Mut
Geçimli, Mut
Gençali, Mut
Göcekler, Mut
Gökçetaş, Mut
Göksu, Mut
Güme, Mut
Güzelköy, Mut
Güzelyurt, Mut
Hacıahmetli, Mut
Hacıilyaslı, Mut
Hacınuhlu, Mut
Hacısait, Mut
Hamam, Mut
Haydarköy, Mut
Hisarköy, Mut
Hocalı, Mut
Ilıca, Mut
Irmaklı, Mut
Işıklar, Mut
İbrahimli, Mut
Kadıköy, Mut
Karacaoğlan, Mut
Karadiken, Mut
Kavaklı, Mut
Kavaközü, Mut
Kayabaşı, Mut
Kayaönü, Mut
Kelceköy, Mut
Kemenli, Mut
Kırkkavak, Mut
Kışlaköy, Mut
Kızılalan, Mut
Köselerli, Mut
Kumaçukuru, Mut
Kurtsuyu, Mut
Kurtuluş, Mut
Kürkçü, Mut
Mirahor, Mut
Mucuk, Mut
Narlı, Mut
Narlıdere, Mut
Ortaköy, Mut
Özköy, Mut
Özlü, Mut
Palantepe, Mut
Pamuklu, Mut
Sakız, Mut
Sarıveliler, Mut
Selamlı, Mut
Suçatı, Mut
Tekeli, Mut
Topkaya, Mut
Topluca, Mut
Tuğrul, Mut
Yalnızcabağ, Mut
Yapıntı, Mut
Yeşilköy, Mut
Yeşilyurt, Mut
Yıldızköy, Mut
Yukarıköselerli, Mut
Zeytinçukuru, Mut

Silifke
Silifke
Akdere, Silifke
Arkum, Silifke
Atakent, Silifke
Atayurt, Silifke
Ayaştürkmenli, Silifke
Bahçe, Silifke
Bahçederesi, Silifke
Balandız, Silifke
Bayındır, Silifke
Bolacalıkoyuncu, Silifke
Burunucu, Silifke
Bükdeğirmeni, Silifke
Canbazlı, Silifke
Cılbayır, Silifke
Çadırlı, Silifke
Çaltıbozkır, Silifke
Çamlıbel, Silifke
Çamlıca, Silifke
Çatak, Silifke
Çeltikçi, Silifke
Demircili, Silifke
Ekşiler, Silifke
Evkafçiftliği, Silifke
Gedikpınarı, Silifke
Gökbelen, Silifke
Gülümpaşalı, Silifke
Gündüzler, Silifke
Hırmanlı, Silifke
Hüseyinler, Silifke
Işıklı, Silifke
İmambekirli, Silifke
İmamlı, Silifke
İmamuşağı, Silifke
Karahacılı, Silifke
Karakaya, Silifke
Kargıcak, Silifke
Kavak, Silifke
Keben, Silifke
Kepez, Silifke
Keşlitürkmenli, Silifke
Kıca, Silifke
Kırtıl, Silifke
Kızılgeçit, Silifke
Kocaoluk, Silifke
Kocapınar, Silifke
Kurtuluş, Silifke
Mağara, Silifke
Narlıkuyu, Silifke
Nasrullah, Silifke
Nuru, Silifke
Ortaören, Silifke
Ovacık, Silifke
Ören, Silifke
Özboynuinceli, Silifke
Öztürkmenli, Silifke
Pelitpınarı, Silifke
Sabak, Silifke
Sarıaydın, Silifke
Senir, Silifke
Seydili, Silifke
Seyranlık, Silifke
Sökün, Silifke
Sömek, Silifke
Şahmurlu, Silifke
Taşucu, Silifke
Tosmurlu, Silifke
Türkmenuşağı, Silifke
Ulugöz, Silifke
Uşakpınarı, Silifke
Uzuncaburç, Silifke
Yeğenli, Silifke
Yenibahçe, Silifke
Yenisu, Silifke
Yeşilovacık, Silifke

Tarsus 
Tarsus
Ağzıdelik, Tarsus
Akarsu, Tarsus
Akçakocalı, Tarsus
Akgedik, Tarsus
Aladağ, Tarsus
Aliağa, Tarsus
Alibeyli, Tarsus
Aliefendioğlu, Tarsus
Alifakı, Tarsus
Ardıçlı, Tarsus
Arıklı, Tarsus
Atalar, Tarsus
Avadan, Tarsus
Baharlı, Tarsus
Bahşiş, Tarsus
Ballıca, Tarsus
Baltalı, Tarsus
Belen, Tarsus
Beylice, Tarsus
Boğazpınar, Tarsus
Bolatlı, Tarsus
Boztepe, Tarsus
Böğrüeğri, Tarsus
Büyükkösebalcı, Tarsus
Camilimanda, Tarsus
Cırbıklar, Tarsus
Cin, Tarsus
Çağbaşı, Tarsus
Çakırlı, Tarsus
Çamalan, Tarsus
Çamtepe, Tarsus
Çatalca, Tarsus
Çavdarlı, Tarsus
Çavuşlu, Tarsus
Çayboyu, Tarsus
Çevreli, Tarsus
Çiçekli, Tarsus
Çiftlik, Tarsus
Çiriştepe, Tarsus
Çokak, Tarsus
Çöplü, Tarsus
Çukurbağ, Tarsus
Dadalı, Tarsus
Damlama, Tarsus
Dedeler, Tarsus
Dorak, Tarsus
Eminlik, Tarsus
Emirler, Tarsus
Esenler, Tarsus
Eskişehir, Tarsus
Göçük, Tarsus
Gömmece, Tarsus
Gülek, Tarsus
Günyurdu, Tarsus
Gürlü, Tarsus
Hacıbozan, Tarsus
Hacıhamzalı, Tarsus
Halitağa, Tarsus
Hasanağa, Tarsus
İbrişim, Tarsus
İncirgediği, Tarsus
İncirlikuyu, Tarsus
İnköy, Tarsus
Kaburgediği, Tarsus
Kadelli, Tarsus
Kaklıktaşı, Tarsus
Kaleburcu, Tarsus
Kanberhüyüğü, Tarsus
Karaçerçili, Tarsus
Karadiken, Tarsus
Karadirlik, Tarsus
Karakütük, Tarsus
Karayayla, Tarsus
Kargılı, Tarsus
Karsavran, Tarsus
Kayadibi, Tarsus
Kefeli, Tarsus
Kelahmet, Tarsus
Kerimler, Tarsus
Keşli, Tarsus
Kırıt, Tarsus
Kızılçukur, Tarsus
Kocaköy, Tarsus
Koçmarlı, Tarsus
Konaklar, Tarsus
Kozoluk, Tarsus
Kösebalcı, Tarsus
Köselerli, Tarsus
Kulak, Tarsus
Kumdere, Tarsus
Kurbanlı, Tarsus
Kurtçukuru, Tarsus
Kuşçular, Tarsus
Kütüklü, Tarsus
Mahmutağa, Tarsus
Mantaş, Tarsus
Meşelik, Tarsus
Muratlı, Tarsus
Nemiroğlu, Tarsus
Olukkoyağı, Tarsus
Özbek, Tarsus
Özlüce, Tarsus
Pirömerli, Tarsus
Reşadiye, Tarsus
Sağlıklı, Tarsus
Sandal, Tarsus
Sanlıca, Tarsus
Sarıveli, Tarsus
Sayköy, Tarsus
Sıraköy, Tarsus
Simithacılı, Tarsus
Sucular, Tarsus
Takbaş, Tarsus
Taşçılı, Tarsus
Taşkuyu, Tarsus
Taşobası, Tarsus
Tekeliören, Tarsus
Tepeçaylak, Tarsus
Tepeköy, Tarsus
Tepetaşpınar, Tarsus
Topaklı, Tarsus
Topçu, Tarsus
Ulaş, Tarsus
Verimli, Tarsus
Yalamık, Tarsus
Yanıkkışla, Tarsus
Yaramış, Tarsus
Yazlık, Tarsus
Yenice, Tarsus
Yeniçay, Tarsus
Yeniköy, Tarsus
Yeşiltepe, Tarsus
Yunusoğlu, Tarsus
Yüksek, Tarsus

Recent development

According to Law act no 6360, all Turkish provinces with a population more than 750 000, were renamed as metropolitan municipality. All districts in those provinces became second level municipalities and all villages in those districts  were renamed as a neighborhoods (mahalle). Thus the villages listed above are officially neighborhoods of Mersin.

References 

List
Mediterranean Region, Turkey
Mersin